Bites and Remission is a compilation by Skinny Puppy released on Nettwerk in 1987.  The release of this compilation coincides with that of Remission & Bites and contains many of the same songs, albeit in a different context.  This compilation culls songs from the assorted releases of Skinny Puppy's first two albums, Remission and Bites, and features remixes of two songs in place of their original versions.

Track listing

Notes
The most notable samples on the song "The Choke (Re-Grip)" are from 1976 film The Tenant.

References

External links
Bites and Remission at Discogs (Nettwerk)
Bites and Remission at Discogs (IMPORTANT records)

1987 compilation albums
Skinny Puppy compilation albums
Nettwerk Records compilation albums